Zhiwei Robotics Corp. is a Chinese robotics manufacturer and open source hardware provider. The company was founded in 2008 by Ricky Ye and is currently headquartered in Shanghai, China.

History
Zhiwei Robotics Corp. was established in 2008 and their headquarters was moved to Zhangjiang Hi-Tech Park, Shanghai in 2010. The company is also known as DFRobot which is the abbreviation of Drive the Future and Dream Factory. Zhiwei Robotics Corp. is among the early campaigners of the Maker Movement in China and Arduino, an open-source manufacturer of single-board microcontrollers and microcontroller kits for building digital devices. The company opened their manufacturing plant in Chengdu in 2011. Zhiwei Robotics Corp. started their first hackerspace, Mushroom Cloud, in Shanghai, in 2012. In March 2016, according to the Ministry of Science and Technology of the People's Republic of China officially selected Mushroom Cloud into the national public space, and included into National Science and Technology Business Incubator Management System of China.

In November 2016, Zhiwei Robotics Corp. received the High-tech Enterprise Certificate award by the Shanghai Municipal Science and Technology Commission, the Shanghai Municipal Bureau of Finance, the Shanghai Municipal State Taxation Bureau, and the Shanghai Local Taxation Bureau jointly. In December 2016, Zhiwei Robotics Corp. was listed at the national share transfer system.

Technology and products
Zhiwei Robotics Corp. is a manufacturer and provider of electronic components and widgets such as Arduino controller, Raspberry Pi, development boards, sensors and modules, robotics, and 3D printers.

Boson - The Boson kit is a set of modular electronic building blocks composed of 45 different modules. Boson kit is code-free STEM kit, which is claimed to be compatible with the BBC Micro Bit.
Antbo - Antbo is an assembling bionic robot. It collects users' data and uploads it to the cloud. Users can to check matrix-like distance and skill level and then share their accomplishments with other users. Through voice-control and lighting it can develop an emotional connection with users.
Vortex - Vortex is an Arduino-based robot. The robot is programmed to initiate commands by tapping the screen in the Vortex app. Vortex has 32 eyes expressions and unlimited light effects.
LattePanda - LattePanda is a development board with built-in Arduino that runs a desktop version of Windows 10, Linux and Android.
Overlord Proplus - Overlord ProPlus is a 3D printer which was released in 2015.

References

External links
Official website

Robotics companies of China
Manufacturing companies based in Shanghai